Megadytes ducalis is a species of water beetle in the family Dytiscidae. Until recently, the species was only known from a single specimen that was collected in the 1800s from Brazil, but more specimens were discovered in 2019.

History
The first specimen of M. ducalis was collected in the 1800s from an unknown locality in Brazil. Rumors indicate it was found in the bottom of a canoe in the Amazon.

In 2019, a study reported 10 additional specimens (including the first female of the species), all collected from the end of the 19th century, discovered incidentally in various historical collections. While the original holotype lacked any location data, the new specimens all indicate that they were collected in Santo Antonio da Barra (now known as Condeuba) in the southern part of Bahia, Brazil. Villagers in the region were involved in insect trade, capturing the much sought after specimens of Hypocephalus armatus found around the region. 

As a consequence of the lack of recent records, the IUCN lists it as extinct. Considering the absence of information about the species and the limited studies conducted on water beetles in Brazil, it might still survive.

Morphology
Megadytes ducalis is a large and robust beetle with total length ranging from 42.9 to 47.7 mm. It is distinctly larger than congeners such as M. lherminieri and M. magnus, and not as broadly oval in shape as them. The two sexes of M. ducalis are externally similar, except for females being shiny without any signs of striae on the dorsal surface, and lacking protarsal disks and yellow setae on ventral surface of mesotarsomere I.

Ecology
Dytiscidae in general are aquatic and are predators as both adults and larvae.

Distribution 
This species appears to have a restricted distribution in the cerrado of Western Brazil.

References 

Dytiscidae
Extinct animals of Brazil
Beetles described in 1882
Taxonomy articles created by Polbot
Extinct insects